Buscamos Sonrisas (English: We Seek Smiles), is the title of El Sueño de Morfeo's fourth studio album, which was released on 14 February 2012. This was confirmed by the group on their Facebook page. The first single, entitled "Depende de ti" premiered on Spanish radio station Radio Valleseco on 3 November 2011 and was available to download on 15 November.

Track listing
Three of the album's songs were confirmed for the album after being performed on their 2011 tour, whilst another four song titles were revealed by El País on 4 January 2012. The full album track listing and pre-order was released on iTunes on 2 February;

References

2012 albums
El Sueño de Morfeo albums